Hans-Jürgen Geschke (also known as Tutti, born 7 July 1943) is a German former track cyclist who competed for East Germany in the 1968, 1972 and 1976 Olympics. After having won the silver medal in the 2000 m tandem, alongside Werner Otto, he claimed the bronze medal in the 1000 m sprint in 1976. At the world championships Geschke and Otto won two gold, one silver and one bronze medal in the tandem in 1969–1973, and Geschke added a sprint gold in 1977.

Geschke is the father of road racing cyclist Simon Geschke.

References

External links

 

1943 births
Living people
East German male cyclists
Cyclists at the 1968 Summer Olympics
Cyclists at the 1972 Summer Olympics
Cyclists at the 1976 Summer Olympics
Olympic cyclists of East Germany
Olympic silver medalists for East Germany
Olympic bronze medalists for East Germany
Cyclists from Berlin
Olympic medalists in cycling
Medalists at the 1972 Summer Olympics
Medalists at the 1976 Summer Olympics
People from East Berlin